The Church of the Presentation of the Virgin in the Temple is part of the wooden churches of Maramureș World Heritage Site, and is located in Bârsana Commune, Maramureș County, Romania. The church was built in 1720 and it features some of the most representative baroque indoor murals in Maramureş. It has a collection of icons painted on glass and old religious books.

Its name refers to the Presentation of Mary.

Presentation
Churches completed in 1720
18th-century Eastern Orthodox church buildings
Romanian Orthodox churches in Romania
1720 establishments in Europe
18th-century churches in Romania